Aniane is a commune in the Hérault department in the Occitanie region in southern France.

Population

See also
 Benedict of Aniane
 Pont du Diable, Hérault
 Mas de Daumas Gassac
Communes of the Hérault department

References

External links

 Town website (in French)

Communes of Hérault